Antoni Molne Oviedo (born 27 April 1969) is an Andorran judoka who competed in the 1992 Summer Olympics and the 1996 Summer Olympics.

Molne entered the extra lightweight competition at the 1992 Summer Olympics and after receiving a bye in the first round he lost to the Italian, Marino Cattefra in the next round. Four years later at the 1996 Summer Olympics he competed in the 65 kg weight division, again he received a bye in the first round before losing to Timur Mukhamedkhanov from Uzbekistan.

References

1969 births
Living people
Andorran male judoka
Olympic judoka of Andorra
Judoka at the 1992 Summer Olympics
Judoka at the 1996 Summer Olympics